The president of the Treasury Board is a minister of the Crown in the Canadian Cabinet. The president is the chair of the Treasury Board of Canada (a committee of Cabinet in the Privy Council) and is the minister responsible for the Treasury Board Secretariat, the central agency which is responsible for accounting for the Government of Canada's fiscal operations.

The president of the Treasury Board has been Mona Fortier since October 26, 2021.

History and overview 
As a ministerial position, the office of Treasury Board President was created in the Cabinet in 1966 when the Treasury Board Secretariat became a full-fledged department of the federal government. Prior to 1966, the minister of finance was ex officio the chairman of the Treasury Board, as the Secretariat was part of the Department of Finance since Confederation (1867).

The Secretariat is a central agency and the administrative arm of the Treasury Board. Technically, the Board is a Cabinet committee of the Privy Council, and is responsible for managing the government's fiscal and administrative responsibilities, including management of the civil service and oversight of expenditures.

The formal role of the president is to chair the Treasury Board. The officeholder is responsible for carrying out the management of the government through operationalizing the policies and programs approved by Cabinet and through providing federal departments with the necessary resources, among other things.

List of presidents of the Treasury Board
This is a list of presidents of the Treasury Board since 1966, when the office became a full ministerial position in Cabinet. Prior to 1966, the Treasury Board Secretariat belonged to the Department of Finance and, as such, the minister of finance was ex officio the chairman of the Treasury Board.

Key:

References

President of the Treasury Board (Canada)

Canada